Mocha Motion! is an album by American organist Freddie Roach released on Prestige in 1967.

Track listing
All compositions tracks by Freddie Roach, unless otherwise noted
"Samba de Orfeu" (Bonfá) - 5:24
"(Good) Morning Time" - 5:35
"Money (That's What I Want)" (Bradford, Gordy) - 4:25
"Stinky Fingers" - 4:01
"Here Comes the Mocha Man" - 5:19
"Johnnie's Comin' Home No More" - 5:17
"Warning Shot"	(Goldsmith) - 6:34

Personnel
Freddie Roach - organ, vocals (#6)
Vinnie Corrao - guitar
Eddie Gladden - drums
Ralph Dorsey - congas

References

Prestige Records albums
Freddie Roach (organist) albums
1967 albums
Albums recorded at Van Gelder Studio
Albums produced by Ozzie Cadena